This article concerns the period 849 BC – 840 BC.

Events and trends
 845 BC—Pherecles, King of Athens, dies after a reign of 19 years and is succeeded by his son Ariphron.
 842 BC—Shalmaneser III devastates the territory of Damascus; Israel and the Phoenician cities send tribute.
 841 BC—Exile of King Li of the Zhou Dynasty of Ancient China, and the Gonghe Regency, began.  Records of the Grand Historian (compiled by historian Sima Qian by 91 BC) regards this year as the first year of consecutive annual dating of Chinese history.

References